Survivor Česko & Slovensko Hrdinové vs. Rebelové is the second season of a joint Czech-Slovak version of the reality television game show Survivor. This season only consists of Ondřej Novotný hosting this season unlike the previous season where he had a co-host. The season has also expanded in the amount of days the season ran for, lasting 80 days to the previous 68 days where contestants try and win 2,500,000 Kč. The season premiered on January 25, 2023.

Contestants

References

External links
 {Czech}
 {Slovak}

Czech reality television series
Slovak reality television series
Survivor (franchise) seasons